Teresa Wanjiku Mbugua (born 7 May 1974) is a Kenyan long-distance runner who competed in road running and cross country running disciplines. She ran distances from the 10K run to the marathon and was active from 1997 to 2011.

Wanjiku represented Kenya at the 1999 IAAF World Cross Country Championships and placed eighth in the women's short race. She won numerous road races in the United States including the City of Pittsburgh Great Race (twice), Broad Street Run, Fifth Third River Bank Run (twice) and the Cherry Blossom Ten Mile Run.

Personal bests
10K run – 31:01 min (2002)
Half marathon – 71:42 min (2002)
Marathon – 2:48:40 (2007)

All information from All-Athletics profile

International competitions

Road race wins
City of Pittsburgh Great Race: 1998, 2004
Broad Street Run: 1998
Fifth Third River Bank Run: 1999, 2002
Cherry Blossom Ten Mile Run: 2000
Phoenix 10K: 2001
Medellín Half Marathon: 2002
Parkersburg Half Marathon: 2002
Bogotá Half Marathon: 2002
Run Barbados Half Marathon: 2004
Montreal Half Marathon: 2006

References

External links

Living people
1974 births
Kenyan female long-distance runners
Kenyan female marathon runners